Annelies Verbeke (born 6 February 1976) is a Belgian author who writes in Dutch. She made her name with the novel Slaap! (Sleep!) which has been translated into several languages.

Biography
Verbeke studied language and literature at Ghent University before attending a scriptwriting course in Brussels. In 2003, she gained instant fame with her first novel Slaap! (Sleep!) when 70,000 copies of the Dutch edition were sold. The story has since been published in 22 countries. The award-winning work was highlighted for the way in which it showed how people with various backgrounds were all looking for fulfillment.

A more recent international success has been Vissen redden (Saving Fish, 2009), also translated into several languages including German and Danish.

Selected works
Novels
(2003) Slaap! (Sleep!)
(2006) Reus (Giant)
(2009) Vissen redden (Saving Fish)
(2015) Dertig dagen (Thirty Days)

Short story collections
(2007) Groener Gras (Greener Grass)
(2012) Veronderstellingen (Presuppositions)

Other works
(2013) Tirol inferno (Tirol Inferno), prose poem
(2014) Onvoltooid landschap (Unfinished Landscape), short story

Plays
(2009) Stukken (Pieces)
(2010) Rail Gourmet (Rail Gourmet)
(2010) Almschi
(2012) Flow My Tears

References

External links

 (in Dutch)

1976 births
21st-century Belgian women writers
20th-century Belgian dramatists and playwrights
21st-century Belgian dramatists and playwrights
Belgian women short story writers
Belgian short story writers
Belgian women novelists
20th-century Belgian novelists
21st-century Belgian novelists
Living people
Belgian women dramatists and playwrights
21st-century short story writers
Flemish women writers